KTKE 101.5 FM is a radio station licensed to Truckee, California.  The station broadcasts an Adult Album Alternative format and is owned by Joel Depaoli, through licensee Truckee Tahoe Radio, LLC.

References

External links
KTKE's official website

TKE
Adult album alternative radio stations in the United States